Peter Mountford may refer to:
Peter Mountford (footballer) (born 1960), English footballer
Peter Mountford (author) (born 1976), American novelist and writer
Peter Mountford (cricketer) (born 1940), English cricketer